The deep external pudendal artery (deep external pudic artery) is one of the pudendal arteries that is more deeply seated than the superficial external pudendal artery, passes medially across the pectineus and the adductor longus muscles; it is covered by the fascia lata, which it pierces at the medial side of the thigh, and is distributed, in the male, to the integument of the scrotum and perineum, in the female to the labia majora; its branches anastomose with the scrotal or labial branches of the perineal artery.

Additional Images

See also
 Internal pudendal artery

References

External links
 

Arteries of the lower limb